Daniel Sanchez (born 21 November 1953) is a French football manager and former professional player who played as a striker.

Managerial statistics

References

External links
 
 Profile
 Profile

1953 births
Living people
French people of Spanish descent
French sportspeople of Moroccan descent
People from Oujda
French footballers
Association football forwards
OGC Nice players
Paris Saint-Germain F.C. players
FC Mulhouse players
AS Saint-Étienne players
AS Cannes players
Ligue 1 players
French football managers
OGC Nice managers
Tours FC managers
Valenciennes FC managers
Nagoya Grampus managers
Club Africain football managers
Ligue 1 managers
J1 League managers
Tunisian Ligue Professionnelle 1 managers
French expatriate football managers
French expatriate sportspeople in Japan
French expatriate sportspeople in Tunisia
Expatriate football managers in Japan
Expatriate football managers in Tunisia